Sigai is a 2017 Tamil language drama film directed by Jagadeesan Subu. The movie has Kathir in the lead role while Meera Nair, Raj Bharath, Riythvika, and Mayilsamy are in support. Kathir plays a role of a transgender person, and a non-resident Indian who occasionally comes to India to visit his school friend.

Plot
His possessiveness and close association with his friend is the cause of a major accident that kills two innocent people. Kathir feels highly dejected when his close friend looks for companionship with other women, ignoring his emotions.

The movie is set in Anna Nagar and depicts events that happen in one day. The movie opens with a pimp named Prasath (Raj Barath) handling prostitutes with his partner Chetta (Rajesh Sharma). Prasath shows special care for a prostitute named Buvana (Riythvika) and treats her better than the others.

One night, a customer named Santhosh (Mal Maruga) calls Prasath and asks him for a girl. Prasath asks Chetta, who suggests Nirmala alias Nimmi (Meera Nair) to be sent. She lives as a prostitute without the knowledge of her family, which consists of her mother and siblings, who are scared of her. She is taken to Santhosh by the help of Subramani (Mayilsamy), a cab driver who drops her at Santhosh's place.

The next day, Prasath and Chetta discover that Nimmi has not gone to other customers and that Santhosh was her last customer. They get puzzled, as Santosh states that she left and her phone is not answered. They then investigate different places with the help of Subramani. They soon reach Santhosh's house, where they find him dead with no clue of Nimmi. Later, Chetta leaves Prasath and Subramani, and they both go to KFC for further investigation and are left clueless. They return to Santhosh's house, where they find Nimmi dead. Prasath is left alone seeing Chetta getting caught and later sees a man crying on his roof. He follows the man, who reveals what had happened.

The man reveals himself to be Mathivanan (Kathir), who is an NRI and comes to India each year to meet Santhosh. One night, Santhosh invites Nimmi to get laid. Nimmi seduces Mathi and says that it is alright for her to manage people while eating. Nimmi waits in the room for them, while Santhosh is drunk and allows Mathi to go first. Mathi tells Nimmi to leave, and she remains stubborn and mocks him. He accidentally kills her and cries out in guilt, later revealing that he is a transgender person who wanted Santhosh to share his feelings. He hides her body in the fridge and tells the now-recovered Santosh that she had left earlier. Later, Santosh discovers her body and gets to know Mathi's true colors. He too mocks Mathi, ignoring his feelings towards him and is accidentally killed by him. He hides due to the arrival of Prasath at that moment and cries out in pain that he faced as transgender. He completes narrating what happened that night, shares his pain, and leaves the place back at the present.

A few months later, we can see Chetta being a much stricter pimp, providing strict guidelines to his girls. Prasath stopping being a pimp after listening to Subramani's words and marrying Buvana, and Mathi living life as a transgender person by growing a lot of hair.

The film ends by showing a few transgender people.

Cast

 Kathir as Mathivanan 
 Meera Nair as Nirmala (Nimmi)
 Raj Bharath as Prasath
 Riythvika as Buvana
 Mayilsamy as Subramani
 Rajesh Sharma as Chetta
 Mal Maruga as Santhosh
 Brila Boss as Prem 
 Vishalini as Prem's spouse
 Muthukumar as Manager
 Kani Venkatesh as suspect

Production
Kathir revealed he had to endure hardships while applying prosthetic makeup to look like a woman.

Release
The film premiered at the 2017 All Lights India International Film Festival. It was released on ZEE5 on 9 January 2019, bypassing a theatrical release.

References

External links 

2017 films
2010s Tamil-language films
Indian thriller films
Cross-dressing in Indian films
Transgender-related films
2017 directorial debut films
ZEE5 original films
2017 direct-to-video films
2017 LGBT-related films
2017 thriller films